Ippodromi all'alba is a 1950 Italian short documentary film directed by Alessandro Blasetti.

External links
 
Ippodromi all'alba

1950 films
1950s Italian-language films
Italian documentary films
1950 documentary films
Italian black-and-white films
1950s Italian films